A hydrogen tanker is a tank ship designed for transporting liquefied hydrogen.

Research
The World Energy Network research program of the Japanese New Sunshine Project was divided into 3 phases during the period 1993 to 2002, its goal was to study the distribution of liquid hydrogen with hydrogen tankers based on the LNG carrier technology of self-supporting tank designs such as the prismatic and spherical tank. Further research on maritime transport of hydrogen was done in the development for safe utilization and infrastructure of hydrogen project (2003–2007).

Similar to an LNG carrier the boil off gas can be used for propulsion of the ship.

The "Suiso Frontier" collected a cargo of liquid hydrogen from the port of Hastings in Victoria, Australia on 28 January 2022 and arrived back in Kobe, Japan at the end of February, 2022 with the cargo.
A second cargo was collected from the Hastings terminal in May, 2022 with a return to Japan in June 2022.

See also
Euro Quebec hydro hydrogen project
Hydrogen ship
Hydrogen infrastructure
Hydrogen economy

References

External links
1996 - Design of a 200,000 cubic meter Hydrogen Tanker

Ship types
Hydrogen ships
Hydrogen infrastructure
Industrial gases
Hydrogen tankers